Joseph Edward Turner (13 June 1917 – 29 August 1992) was a Yorkshire-born English actor and comedian who played dustbin man Chalky Whiteley in the soap opera Coronation Street. He also played the part of the similarly named farmer Bill Whiteley in Emmerdale from 1989 to 1990. In the late 1970s he played the part of Mrs. Pumphrey's manservant Hodgekin in All Creatures Great and Small, Gordon in Open All Hours and subsequently the part of Banks in the popular 1980s sitcom Never the Twain. He also made occasional appearances in Last of the Summer Wine. He died of emphysema in 1992 at the age of 75.

Filmography

External links
 

1917 births
1992 deaths
20th-century English comedians
20th-century English male actors
Deaths from cancer in England
Deaths from emphysema
English male comedians
English male soap opera actors